1983 The Hot Ones was a various artists "hits" compilation album released in Australia in 1983 by Festival Records. The album spent four weeks at the top of the Australian album charts in 1983.

Track listing

Charts

References

1983 compilation albums
Pop compilation albums
Festival Records compilation albums